The Entity is a 1982 horror film.

The Entity may also refer to:
The Entity (album), an album by King Gordy
The Entity (comics), a fictional device from Malibu Comics' Ultraverse
The Entity (2015 film), a 2015 Peruvian horror film
"The Entity" (South Park), an episode of the animated television series South Park
Kuwaresma, a 2019 Philippine horror film also known as The Entity

See also	
 Entity (disambiguation)